Roberto José Bordeu Baliero (born 13 August 1931) was an Argentine bobsledder who competed from the early 1950s to the mid-1960s. Competing in two Winter Olympics, he earned his best finish of eighth in the four-man event at Oslo in 1952.

Twelve years later he finished 16th in the four-man event at the 1964 Winter Olympics.

References

External links
 

1931 births
Living people
Argentine male bobsledders
Olympic bobsledders of Argentina
Bobsledders at the 1952 Winter Olympics
Bobsledders at the 1964 Winter Olympics